Victoria Derbyshire is a British weekday current affairs programme which was simulcast from 7 April 2015 on BBC Two and BBC News Channel hosted by Victoria Derbyshire. Its remit includes original stories, exclusive interviews and audience debates.

It also acts as a showcase for BBC journalism using reports and interviews by BBC Nations and Regions, BBC World Service, language services and other programmes such as Newsnight, World News Today and Global, plus the BBC Online teams such as BBC Trending and BBC Pop Up. Occasionally the uncut versions of interviews were aired as well, in this case they were taken in place of HARDtalk and aired by BBC World News as well.

Broadcasting
Until 2018, the show was broadcast live on BBC Two and BBC News from 9:00am to 11:00am every Monday to Friday, from then on its start time was shifted forward an hour to 10:00am. Its episodes were available to watch for 30 days after release on the BBC iPlayer catch-up service. On 22 January 2020, it was announced that the programme would be axed in later 2020 as part of BBC cuts. However, due to priority put on coverage of the COVID-19 pandemic, the BBC suspended the program earlier than initially planned with the final episode airing on 17 March 2020. Derbyshire has remained as a presenter in the same time slot, instead presenting a standardly structured BBC World News newscast.

Presenters

When Derbyshire was away (on leave, on an assignment, or elsewhere), the titles described the programme as 'with' the stand-in presenter.

Reporters/segment presenters
Aaron Heslehurst (Business)
Ore Oduba (Sport)
Katherine Downes (Sport)
Carol Kirkwood (Weather)
Benjamin Zand (Also film producer, Editor of BBC Pop Up)

Cancellation
The BBC described it as the "centrepiece of domestic daytime TV news," and the initial "digital first" TV show. Of the first ten editions of the Victoria Derbyshire programme, one show in April 2015 attracted only 39,000 viewers and gained a 'zero rating."

The programme was cancelled in January 2020 as part of the cost-cutting in BBC News. On Twitter, Amol Rajan, the BBC's media editor, said the costs were deemed too high for a conventionally watched linear show, but said its "Digital impact was huge. Show was designed to reach audiences the BBC struggles to connect with, and it did - online." The last programme was broadcast on 17 March 2020, itself being moved forward as a result of restrictions imposed by the BBC due to the COVID-19 pandemic.

Controversies
An episode of the Victoria Derbyshire show broadcast on 22 May 2015 featured an interview with Lisa Longstaff from the organisation Women Against Rape. During the broadcast, Longstaff made reference to the case of Eleanor de Freitas, a woman who died of suicide while being prosecuted for allegedly perverting the course of justice by allegedly making a false rape claim. Longstaff twice referred to the alleged victim of the false rape claim as a "rapist" which was not challenged by the interviewer. The BBC later issued an apology for any distress they had caused as a result of the broadcast and made it clear that the person referred to had never been tried or convicted of rape.

Awards
In 2015, Derbyshire was nominated for RTS Presenter of the Year along with Zand who was nominated in the Young Talent category which Zand won.
Derbyshire won Broadcaster of the Year at the PinkNews Awards in 2015 and 2016. In 2017, the programme won a BAFTA for its coverage of former footballers who had been sexually abused.

References

External links

  (BBC Two)

2015 British television series debuts
2020 British television series endings
BBC television news shows
British television news shows
BBC television talk shows
Current affairs shows
2010s British television talk shows
2020s British television talk shows
Television productions cancelled due to the COVID-19 pandemic